Mirela Brekalo (born 6 February 1956) is a Croatian actress. She appeared in more than forty films since 1978.

Selected filmography

References

External links 

1956 births
Living people
Actresses from Zagreb
Croatian film actresses
Golden Arena winners